The 2016 Oceania Beach Handball Championship was held at Coolangatta Beach, Queensland, Australia between February 24 and 28, 2016. There were two divisions, men's and women's with only Australia and New Zealand entering.

In the men's draw, defending champions Australia were pushed all the way by New Zealand winning in the end two sets to one. In the women's draw, Australia were also the defending champions and won two sets to nill. Both Australian team qualify for the 2016 Beach Handball World Championships in Hungary.

Results

Men's division

Women's division

References

 2016 Australian Beach Handball Championships. Change her game. 25 Feb, 2016
 2016 Oceania Beach Handball World Championships Qualification: Womens. YouTube.
 Australian teams qualify for Beach Handball World Championships. Handball Australia. Thu, 3 March 2016

Beach handball competitions
Oceania Beach Handball Championship
2016 Oceania Beach Handball Championship
Oceania Handball Championship
Oceania Beach Handball Championship
Sports competitions on the Gold Coast, Queensland
Coolangatta